Spain competed at the 2012 Summer Paralympics in London, United Kingdom, from 29 August to 9 September 2012.

Spain sent 142 competitors to London, 23% of whom were women.
The team was composed of 224 people, with 127 sportspeople and 15 guides, and 82 support staff.  They competed in 15 different sports, and 74% of the competitors had connections to a high performance sport center in Spain.

Medalists
The Spanish Paralympic Committee had €600,000 to allocate to Spanish Paralympic medalists. For sportspeople eligible for only one medal, they were eligible for €15,000 for a gold, €7,500 for a silver and €4,500 for a bronze.  For sportspeople eligible for more than one medal, golds were €10,000, silvers were worth €5,000 and bronze medals were worth €3,000.  In team sports, gold medals were worth  €5,000, silver medals were worth €2,500 and bronze medals were worth €1,500.

Archery

Men 

|-
|align=left|Guillermo Rodriguez Gonzalez
|align=left|Men's individual compound open
|649
|13
|W 6-4
|W 6-4
|W 6-4
|L 4-6
|L 2-6
|4
|-
|align=left|Jose Marin Rodriguez
|align=left|Men's individual recurve W1/W2
|591
|11
|W 6-0
|L 2-6
|colspan=4|Did not advance
|}

Women 

|-
|align=left|Maria Rubio Larrion
|align=left|Women's individual compound open
|637
|9
|
|W 6-4
|L 4-6
|colspan=3|Did not advance
|}

Athletics 

Spain sent 24 track and field competitors to London. Joan Munar Martínez was the youngest member of the team at 16 years of age. Competitors in track and field for Spain include Elena Congost Mohedano, José Martínez Morote and Antonio Andujar Arroyo.
Men's track

Men's field

Women's track

Women's field

Boccia

Individual events

Pairs and team events

Cycling

Football 5-a-side

Spain qualified for the 5-a-side tournament.

Group play

Semifinal

Bronze medal match

Judo

Men

Women

Powerlifting

Rowing

Spain sent only one rower to London, Juan Pablo Barcia.

Sailing

Shooting

Swimming

Men

Women

Table tennis

Men

Wheelchair basketball

Men's tournament

The Spanish men's wheelchair basketball team were in Group A with the United States, Australia, South Africa, Italy and Turkey.

Group stage

Quarter-final

5th–8th place semi-final

5th/6th place match

Wheelchair fencing

Wheelchair tennis

See also
Spain at the Paralympics
Spain at the 2012 Summer Olympics

References

Nations at the 2012 Summer Paralympics
2012
2012 in Spanish sport